Akropolis is a shopping center in Kaunas and the fourth largest shopping mall in Lithuania 81,000 m2 (870,000 sq ft). It was built by the Lithuanian company AB "Akropolis Group" in 2007. It was built near the river Nemunas. It is located near to the river and Žalgirio Arena. On the west side of the building there is a four-level free car park, the fourth floor of which can be reached by car as a viewpoint.

There are grocery stores, Maxima LT supermarket, shops etc. The mall also has bookstores. Inside the building there are also two older buildings. Akropolis was sold in autumn 2008 to the  company Deka Immobilien GmbH from Germany. The leisure and restaurant area has an area of 10,000 square meters.

See also 
 List of shopping malls in Lithuania

External links 

 Website (lt, en)

References

Shopping malls in Kaunas
Commercial buildings completed in 2007